Black Cascade is the third full-length studio album by the American ambient black metal band Wolves in the Throne Room. It was released through Southern Lord Records on March 31, 2009, and in Japan by Daymare Records on May 5, 2009.

Track one shares its name with the painting  "Wanderer above the Sea of Fog" by Caspar David Friedrich.

Track listing

Personnel 
Wolves in the Throne Room
 Nathan Weaver - vocals, guitar
 Will Lindsay - guitar, bass, backing vocals
 Aaron Weaver - drums, synth

Additional
 Randall Dunn - production, mixing
 Christophe Szpajdel – logo

References

External links 
 

2009 albums
Wolves in the Throne Room albums
Southern Lord Records albums
Albums produced by Randall Dunn